Myrmex lineatus is a species of antlike weevil in the beetle family Curculionidae. It is found in North America.

Subspecies
These two subspecies belong to the species Myrmex lineatus:
 Myrmex lineata knowltoni Sleeper
 Myrmex lineata lineata

References

Further reading

External links

 

Curculioninae
Articles created by Qbugbot
Beetles described in 1872